The Meerut Nagar Nigam (MNN) also known as Meerut Municipal Corporation (MMC) is the civic body that governs Meerut city. Established under the Uttar Pradesh Municipal Corporation Act-1959, it is responsible for the civic infrastructure and administration of the city.

The first mayor of Meerut was Late Mr. Arun Jain from independent and first Deputy Mayor was Late Mr. Mohd. Ashraf Advocate. Since then, the Municipal Body has always been alive in its constitution and functioning to the growing needs of citizens.

Meerut is the second largest city in the National Capital region,  and as of 2011 the 33rd most populous urban agglomeration and the 26th most populous city in India. It ranked 292 in 2006 and is projected to rank 242 in 2020 in the list of largest cities and urban areas in the world.

History 
Meerut Town Hall was constructed in 1886 while Municipal Board (Nagar Palika) was established in 1892. On 15 June 1982 it was upgraded as Municipal Council (Nagar Mahapalika). On 31 May 1994 after enactment of Uttar Pradesh Municipal Corporation Act 1959, it was further upgraded as Municipal Corporation (Nagar Nigam).

Objective 
MMC work for providing necessary community services like health care, educational institution, housing, transport etc. by collecting property tax and fixed grant from the Finance Commission and Government of Uttar Pradesh. Its sources of income are taxes on water, houses, markets, entertainment and vehicles paid by residents of the town and grants from the state government. Its annual budget in 2017–18 was ₹4812.2 million.

Amendment 
The 73rd and 74th Constitutional Amendments were introduced in 1992 and were meant to facilitate greater decentralization at the rural and urban level respectively. They did so through providing legal status to local assemblies and entrusting them with greater functions and powers. The inclusion of certain social categories that had historically been marginalized from policy making and implementing structures was fundamental to the project of decentralization.  These social categories were the Scheduled Castes, Scheduled Tribes and women. While the 73rd Amendment applies to the Panchayati Raj system, the 74th Amendment applies to Municipal Corporations, Municipal Councils and Nagar Panchayats depending on the size of the city. The 74th Amendment states:

"Not less than one – third (including the number of seats reserved for women belonging to the Scheduled Castes and Scheduled Tribes) of the total number of seats to be filled by direct election in every Municipality shall be reserved for women and such seats may be allotted by rotation to different constituencies in a Municipality.

Functions 
The Twelfth Schedule to the Constitution lists the subjects that Meerut Municipal Corporation is responsible for. The Corporation is entrusted to perform functions and implement schemes including those in relation to the matters listed in the Twelfth Schedule.

Legislative Branch

Mayor is elected to serve as the de jure head of the municipal corporation. He is the head of the house (Meerut Town Hall) and belong to the party which is in majority. The office of the Mayor has ceremonial role associated with being the First Citizen of the city.

In every five years an election is held to elect corporators to power. The corporators are responsible for overseeing that their constituencies have the basic civic infrastructure in place, and that there is no lacuna on the part of the authorities. Position of Mayor is currently reserved for woman from Scheduled Caste category. Mrs. Sunita Verma from BSP is the incumbent Mayor of the city. Her husband Mr. Yogesh Verma is former MLA from Hastinapur.

Wards
As of 2017, the Meerut Municipal Corporation's legislature, also known as the Corporation Council, consists of 90 directly elected corporators while additional 10 corporators are nominated by state government. Out of 90 directly elected corporators; 35 seats are unreserved, 17 seats are reserved for women coming from any category, 16 seats are reserved for people belong to Other Backward Class category, 7 seats are reserved for women from Other Backward Class category, 10 seats are reserved for people belong to Scheduled Caste category and 5 seats are reserved for women from Scheduled Caste category.

Vande Mataram row 
Following the crackdown on slaughterhouses and the harassment unleashed by the anti-Romeo squad, the Mayor of Meerut told Municipal Commissioner to act to those who refused to sing Vande Mataram at the beginning of the Nagar Nigam board meeting in the city. Mayor Harikant Ahluwalia allegedly did not let seven corporators take part in a meeting after they refused to participate in the singing of the national song. He has also allegedly declared that anyone who does not comply with this rule will not be allowed to cross the threshold of the board room or join meetings. The decision has, understandably, enraged some members of the council, which has around 80 members, for its undemocratic overtone.

The situation came to a boiling point when some members, mostly Muslims, were leaving the room before the recital of the national song commenced. They were informed by some BJP members that "Hindustan mein rehna hai to Vande Mataram kehna hoga (If you want to live in India, you have to sing Vande Mataram)." To placate the enraged majority, the mayor was allegedly forced to pass a resolution through voice votes to make the singing of the national song mandatory at the council.

Executive Branch

The Meerut Municipal Corporation is administratively headed by Municipal Commissioner, who is the de facto head of the municipal corporation, the form of government which is granted to a city of over one million in population. He is an IAS Or PCS officer appointed by the state government to head the staff of the Municipal Corporation, vested with all executive powers of Municipal Corporation and implement the decisions of the Corporation and prepare its annual budget. Municipal Commissioner is assisted by two Additional Municipal Commissioners and one Joint Municipal Commissioner at headquarters located near Ghanta Ghar, Kaiser Ganj Road, Meerut. All departmental heads reports to Municipal Commissioner.

Zones 
Meerut Municipal Corporation is divided into three zones each head either by a Deputy Municipal Commissioner or by an Assistant Municipal Commissioner. The Municipal Corporation is divided into 90 wards, which is managed through 4 zones.

The three Zones are :-
 Headquarters
 Shastri Nagar
 Kanker Khera

Finance and Accounts Department 
Finance and Accounts Department is headed by Chief Finance Officer (CFO). There is one Account Officer and Assistant Account Officer in the department.

Health Department 
Health Department is headed by City Health Officer (CHO). There are many Additional City Health Officers, Veterinary Doctors, Zonal Health Officers etc.

Engineering Department 
Engineering Department is headed by Chief Engineer (CE) who is assisted by three Executive Engineers, one Assistant Engineer and eight Junior Engineers. Department also has many supervisors, clerks, mates and peons.

Water Works Department 
This department is headed by Senior Engineer (SE). Two Executive Engineers, one Assistant Engineer and one supervisor usually manages water related problems in the city.

Sanitation Department 
Sanitation Department is headed by Chief Sanitary Inspector (CSI) who is assisted by many Sanitary Inspectors, Safai Nayak, sweepers.

Street Lighting Department
This department is headed by Inspector, Street Lighting (ISL). Solar Lights, LED lights are used in major parts of the city.

Taxation Department 
Taxation Department is headed by Chief Tax Assessment Officer (CTAO). There are two Tax Assessment Officer and four Tax Superintendents in the department. Department also has many Assistant Tax Superintendents, Revenue Inspectors, clerks and peons.

See also
 Meerut division
 Meerut district
 Meerut (Lok Sabha constituency)
 Meerut (Assembly constituency)
 Meerut Cantt. (Assembly constituency)
 Meerut South (Assembly constituency)

References

Municipal corporations in Uttar Pradesh
Meerut
1994 establishments in Uttar Pradesh